James Rait, MA (1689–1777) was an Anglican clergyman who served in the Scottish Episcopal Church as the Bishop of Brechin from 1742 to 1777.

Biography 
He was consecrated the Bishop of the Diocese of Brechin on 4 October 1742 at Edinburgh by Primus Rattray and bishops Keith and White, having been elected to the position on 25 August 1742.

He died in office on 13 January 1777, aged 87.

References 

 
  

1689 births
1777 deaths
Bishops of Brechin (Episcopalian)
18th-century Scottish Episcopalian bishops